IBM VisualAge Pacbase is a code-switching structured programming language that is developed and maintained by IBM.  VisualAge Pacbase runs on both IBM and non-IBM mainframes and integrates with IBM WebSphere Studio Application Developer.  When compiling Pacbase code it is first translated into COBOL and then compiled to binary.

PACBASE was an early advanced CASE software for mainframes and Unix systems from CGI (Compagnie Générale d'Informatique, a French software house) that supported a wide variety of databases, including DB2 and Oracle. PACBASE generated COBOL code for the servers, and Visual Age for PACBASE was used to create the client side. IBM purchased CGI in the early 1990s and absorbed the code-generating tools into its other offerings.

Pacbase is now considered a legacy system; its main remaining use is in Francophone markets. IBM supported Pacbase through 2015.

More details on the French page of VisualAge Pacbase.

References

External links 
 IBM VisualAge Pacbase Overview
 PCMAG Definition of PACBASE 
 European Users Club of VisualAge Pacbase
 PTF is an HP offer, complete and highly automated processing transforming Pacbase into structured COBOL
 RPPz : replacement solution for VisualAge Pacbase from IBM
 Raincode Labs PACBASE Migration: an automated service to convert PACBASE systems to maintainable native COBOL
 PTF - Program Transformation Factory: Euraxiel (founded by CGI Systems experts) and HP have partnered to offer an end-to-end fully automated PACBASE to maintainable native COBOL transformation service

IBM software
IBM mainframe software
Fourth-generation programming languages